The Hauptvermutung of geometric topology is a now refuted conjecture asking whether any two triangulations of a triangulable space have subdivisions that are combinatorially equivalent, i.e. the subdivided triangulations are built up in the same combinatorial pattern. It was originally formulated as a conjecture in 1908 by Ernst Steinitz and Heinrich Franz Friedrich Tietze, but it is now known to be false.

History
The non-manifold version was disproved by John Milnor in 1961 using Reidemeister torsion.

The manifold version is true in dimensions .

An obstruction to the manifold version was formulated by Andrew Casson and Dennis Sullivan in 1967–69 (originally in the simply-connected case), using the Rochlin invariant and the cohomology group .

In dimension , a homeomorphism  of m-dimensional piecewise linear manifolds has an invariant  such that  is isotopic to a piecewise linear (PL) homeomorphism if and only if .

This quantity  is now seen as a relative version of the triangulation obstruction of Robion Kirby and Laurent C. Siebenmann, obtained in 1970. The Kirby–Siebenmann obstruction is defined for any compact m-dimensional topological manifold M

again using the Rochlin invariant. In particular there are only a finite number of essentially distinct PL structures on M.

For compact simply-connected manifolds of dimension 4, Simon Donaldson found examples with an infinite number of inequivalent PL structures, and Michael Freedman found the E8 manifold which not only has no PL structure, but (by work of Casson) is not even homeomorphic to a simplicial complex.

In 2013, Ciprian Manolescu proved that there exist compact topological manifolds of dimension 5 (and hence of any dimension greater than 5) that are not homeomorphic to a simplicial complex. Thus Casson's example illustrates a more general phenomenon that is not merely limited to dimension 4.

Notes

References

External links 
 Additional material, including original sources
 

Disproved conjectures
Geometric topology
Structures on manifolds
Surgery theory
German words and phrases